Michael Dean Armstrong (born May 24, 1957) is an American politician of the Republican Party. He was a member of the Washington House of Representatives, representing the 12th Legislative District from 2001 to 2013.

References

Republican Party members of the Washington House of Representatives
Living people
1957 births
People from Wenatchee, Washington